The District of Columbia Court of Appeals is the highest court of the District of Columbia, in the United States. Established in 1970, it is equivalent to a state supreme court, except that its authority is derived from the United States Congress rather than from the inherent sovereignty of the states. The court is located in the former District of Columbia City Hall building at Judiciary Square. The D.C. Court of Appeals should not be confused with the District's federal appellate court, the United States Court of Appeals for the District of Columbia Circuit. The D.C. Court of Appeals and the Superior Court of the District of Columbia comprise the District's local court system.

History

For much of the history of the District of Columbia, appeals in local matters were adjudicated by federal courts: first the Circuit Court of the District of Columbia (1801–1863), then the Supreme Court of the District of Columbia (1863–1893) (later renamed the U.S. District Court for the District of Columbia), and finally the District of Columbia Court of Appeals (1893–1970) (later renamed the U.S. Court of Appeals for the District of Columbia Circuit). The first local appellate court was established in 1942 when Congress created the Municipal Court of Appeals to hear appeals from the D.C. Municipal Court and the Juvenile Court. Consisting of a Chief Judge and two Associate Judges, the Municipal Court of Appeals acted as an intermediate appellate court, its decisions reviewable on a discretionary basis by the D.C. Circuit. In 1962, Congress renamed the court the District of Columbia Court of Appeals, and in 1967 its membership was enlarged to six judges.

Federal and local jurisdiction in the D.C. remained entangled until 1970, when Congress enacted the District of Columbia Court Reform and Criminal Procedure Act. In addition to establishing the Superior Court of the District of Columbia, the Act established the District of Columbia Court of Appeals as the "highest court for the District of Columbia," expanded its size to its present composition of nine judges, and broadened its jurisdiction to hear all appeals from the Superior Court and review decisions of the city's mayor and administrative agencies.

Powers

As the court of last resort for the District of Columbia, the Court of Appeals is authorized to review all final orders, judgments, and specified interlocutory orders of the associate judges of the Superior Court of the District of Columbia, as well as decisions of certain D.C. agencies. The court also has jurisdiction to review decisions of administrative agencies, boards, and commissions of the District government, as well as to answer questions of law presented by the Supreme Court of the United States, a United States court of appeals, or the highest appellate court of any state. As authorized by Congress, the court reviews proposed rules of the trial court and develops its own rules for proceedings.

Cases before the court are determined by randomly selected three-judge divisions, unless a hearing or rehearing before the court sitting en banc (with all judges present) is ordered. A hearing or rehearing before the court sitting en banc may be ordered by a majority of the judges in regular active service, generally only when consideration by the full court is necessary to maintain uniformity of its decisions, or when the case involves a question of exceptional importance. The en banc court consists of the nine judges of the court in regular active service, except that a retired judge may sit to rehear a case or controversy if the judge heard the original hearing. The Chief Judge may designate and assign temporarily one or more judges of the Superior Court of the District of Columbia to serve on the District of Columbia Court of Appeals when required.

Members of the court are empowered to adjudicate the oath of office ceremony for the executive cabinet of the president.

In the exercise of its inherent power over members of the legal profession, the court established the District of Columbia Bar and has the power to approve the rules governing attorney disciplinary proceedings. The court also reviews the rules of professional conduct and has established rules governing the admission of members of the District of Columbia Bar and the resolution of complaints concerning the unauthorized practice of law in the District of Columbia.

Judges
The court consists of a chief judge and eight associate judges. The court is assisted by the service of retired judges who have been recommended and approved as senior judges. Despite being the District's local appellate court, judges are appointed by the president of the United States and confirmed by the U.S. Senate for 15-year terms.

Active judges
:

</onlyinclude>

Vacancies and pending nominations

Former judges

See also
Superior Court of the District of Columbia
United States District Court for the District of Columbia

References

External links
 District of Columbia Court of Appeals – Official webpage of the DC Court of Appeals, part of the DC Courts' website.
 

Article I tribunals
Court of Appeals
District of Columbia
1970 establishments in Washington, D.C.
Courts and tribunals established in 1970